The Equal Opportunity for Women in the Workplace Agency (EOWA) is an Australian government agency.  It is a statutory authority located within the portfolio of the Australian Commonwealth Department of Families, Housing, Community Services and Indigenous Affairs (FaHCSIA).

EOWA’s role is to administer the Equal Opportunity for Women in the Workplace Act 1999 (Commonwealth) which was passed by the Federal Parliament in November 2012, and through education, assist organisations to achieve equal opportunity for women. Outlined in Part III Section 10 of the Act, the Agency is primarily a regulatory body, whose role is to annually monitor the reporting of eligible Australian organisations on equal opportunity for women in their workplaces.  The Agency also has responsibility to undertake research, educational and other programs, and more generally promote the understanding of equal opportunity for women in the workplace within the community.

In 2012, the Equal Opportunity for Women in the Workplace Act 1999 was replaced by the Workplace Gender Equality Act 2012. The passing of the new legislation means the Equal Opportunity for Women in the Workplace Agency has now been renamed the Workplace Gender Equality Agency.

The Employer of Choice for Women (EOCFW) citation is announced annually since the 2001 inaugural list of 55 organisations. , the list had grown to 125 organisations.

Personnel 
From 1999 to 2004, Fiona Krautil was the agency's director.

References

External links
 

Gender equality
Employment in Australia
Equal employment opportunity